Starik Khottabych (Old Man Khottabych or Old Khottabych) is a Sovcolor Soviet fantasy film produced in the USSR by Goskino at  Kinostudyia Lenfilm (Lenfilm Studio) in 1956, based on a children's book of the same name by Lazar Lagin who also wrote the film's script, and directed by Gennadi Kazansky. In the United States, the film was released theatrically by Sovexportfilm, with English subtitles, under the title The Flying Carpet through Artkino Pictures in 1960.

Plot summary 
Volka, a 12-year-old Soviet Young Pioneer, discovers an ancient vessel at the bottom of a river. When he opens it, a genie emerges. He calls himself Hassan Abdul-rahman ibn Khottab, but Volka renames him Khottabych. The name Khottabych is derived from the Arabic name Khattab with the Russian patronymic suffix -ych, yielding a Russian equivalent of ibn-Khottab (son of Khottab). Khottabych later claims to be 3,732 years and 5 months old. The grateful Khottabych is ready to fulfill any of Volka's wishes, but it becomes clear that Volka should use the powers of the genie carefully, for they can have some unforeseen undesirable results.

Cast
  as Hassan Abdurrahman ibn Khottab ("Old Khottabych") which is the name of a jinn (kind of non bad spirit)
 Alexey Litvinov as Volka  Kostylkov (Volka ibn Alyosha)
 Genya Khudyskov as Zhenya -  Volka's friend  
 Lyova Kovalychuk as Goga Pilyukin (Goga-Pilyulya ("pill" in Russian) - young boy who verbally spreads news on the street 
 Maya Blinova as Volka's Mother
 Vera Romanova as Glafira Kuzminichna - Goga's Mother
 Olga Cherkasova as Varvara Stepanovna - school class leader
 Efim Kopelyan as emir Mukhammdov : drilling master from Baku (capital of Azerbaijan Republic)
 Aleksandr Larikov as doctor , * Evgeniy Vesnik as militiaman , * Zinaida Sharko as woman who sold ice cream in a circus

Production personnel 
 Production director: Tamara Samoznaeva
 Producer: Lev Makhtin
 Screenplay by Lazar Lagin
 Directed by Gennadi Kazansky
 Cinematographer: Muzakir Shuruckov
 Art directors: Isaak Kaplan, Bella Manevich
 Composer: Nadezhda Simonyan
 Sound operator: Grigory Albert

Special effects team:
 Director of photography: Mihail Shamkovich
 Camera operators: B. Durov, M. Pocrovsky
 Art directors: A. Alekseyev, Mihail Krotkin, Maria Kandat

Production notes 
The novel is influenced by the tale of Aladdin and his magical lamp, and it was quite popular with Soviet kids. There were two major versions of the novel - the original was published in 1938, and a revised version followed in 1955. This later version was the basis of the 1956 film. Revisions to the novel were made by Lagin himself in order to incorporate the changes taking place in the USSR and the rest of the world into the narrative, including some ideological anti-capitalistic elements. The original edition has been republished in the Post-Soviet era.

Awards 
1958 Moscow International Film Festival award
1958 Vancouver International Film Festival award

Video 
Early 1990s - Russkoje Video (VHS)

December 2003 - Russian Cinema Councill (DVD). The disc contains four spoken languages in Dolby Digital 5.1: Russian original, English voice-over, French and Arabic languages; subtitles in Russian, English, French, Spanish, Italian, Dutch, Japanese, Swedish, German, Portuguese, Hebrew, Arabic and Chinese. It also contains special features "Monologue in the Intermission", "Another Genie", filmography and a photo album.

See also 
 The Brass Bottle
 Hindi rusi bhai bhai

External links 
 
 
 
 Lazar Lagin. The Old Genie Hottabych (english translation) at Maksim Moshkow's Library
 Old Khottabych (Movie for kids with English subtitles)
 Юрий Белов. «Старик Хоттабыч»: Учебное пособие к фильму для изучающих русский язык как неродной (Textbook of Russian based on the film)

References 

Soviet fantasy comedy films
Lenfilm films
1956 films
1950s fantasy comedy films
Russian fantasy comedy films
Films based on children's books
Russian children's fantasy films
Films based on Russian novels
1950s Russian-language films
Fictional genies
Films directed by Gennadi Kazansky
Films based on fairy tales
Soviet children's films